Little Gap is a village in eastern Lower Towamensing Township, Carbon County, Pennsylvania on the Aquashicola Creek, which is crossed by a covered bridge, open to vehicular traffic. Blue Mountain Resort is located just to the south of the village, which is split between the Danielsville, Kunkletown, and Palmerton ZIP codes of 18038, 18058, and 18071, respectively.

References

Unincorporated communities in Carbon County, Pennsylvania
Unincorporated communities in Pennsylvania